Istro-Romanian may refer to:

Istro-Romanians
Istro-Romanian language

See also
 Morlachs (disambiguation)

Language and nationality disambiguation pages